Norway has 47 national parks, of which 40 are on the mainland and 7 on Svalbard. National parks in Norway are stricter than many other countries, and nearly all motorized vehicles are prohibited. The Right to roam applies, thus hiking, skiing and camping throughout the park are permitted, given that consideration to nature is taken. Roads, accommodation and national park centers are located outside the national parks. The parks are under the management of The Norwegian Environment Agency  and the local county governor.

Ytre Hvaler is a marine park and all parks in Svalbard also contain marine areas. The newest national park assigned in Norway is Lofotodden established in 2018. Gutulia is the smallest, covering .

Geography and history 
At least 60% of Norway's area is mountainous, lakes or bogs (non-arable land, some of it is used as pastures); 37% is forest of various kinds; and only 3% arable land. It is estimated that between 1900 and 2003 areas more than 5 km from intense construction activity have decreased from 48% to 12% in Norway.

Until about one hundred years ago there was relatively little threat to ecosystems in Norway. The first initiatives to protect land were voiced in 1904, by Yngvar Nielsen, leader of the Norwegian Mountain Touring Association (DNT). The association continued to lobby cases in 1923 and 1938. The natural protection act of 1954 prepared a legal basis for establishing protection areas, and the two first national parks were established in 1962 and 1963. The act of 1954 also established Statens naturvernråd ("Governmental Natural protection council") as an advisory body for the government. The council presented a draft for further natural protecting in 1964, suggesting 16 national parks. These suggestions were approved by Stortinget. It took 25 years, until 1989, before 15 of their suggestions were fulfilled. The 16th suggestion became a naturreservat. The council presented another suggestion in 1986, and this was approved by Stortinget in April 1993. Following this approval, a "second generation" of national parks, as well as expanding borders for the elder, were established from 2001.

The post-industrial era that started in the last 1960s saw areas being protected as national parks or other protected status as a means to regulate the construction of vacation homes, roads, fishing, hunting, and gathering plants.  This trend has accelerated in the last 10 years.  In addition to preserving rare plant and animal life, areas are protected to maintain reference points for environmental research, recreational resources for Norwegians, and as an inheritance for future generations.  The Directorate for Nature Management maintains indicators for the health of nature in Norway, including such measures as biological diversity, erosion, signs of pollution.

For the most part, national parks are open to hiking, cross-country skiing and camping.  Most have a limited number of overnight cabins.

In addition to national parks, the Norwegian government has designated larger areas for protection.  Included in these areas are 153 landscapes covering 14071 km2; 1,701 nature reserves covering 3,418 km2; 24 national parks covering 21,650 km2; 102 natural memorials, and 98 smaller protected areas.  This accounts for 12.1% of Norway's mainland area.

The Norwegian government's goal is to increase this area over time to at least 15%.  They have signalled an interest in preserving marine ecosystems, including the fjords of the western parts of Norway, and the archipelago southwest from Oslo.

Current

Former

Planned

There are also several national park proposals by many different parties: Solværøyene, Storheia; Melkevatn–Hjertvatn–Børsvatn, Okstindan; Frafjordheiene; Oksøy-Ryvingen; Setesdal Vesthei, Trollheimen, Lyngsalpan; Mølen.

Storheia has since been covered in a wind farm and would no longer qualify for protection as a national park, and parts of Melkevatn–Hjertvatn–Børsvatn were protected as a nature reserve rather than a national park.

After being tasked by the Ministry of Climate and Environment in 2018 to find areas that should be protected, in 2019 the Environment Agency made a number of suggestions for new national parks as well as expansions of existing ones, after looking through suggestions from the county governors. In 2021, after meetings with the affected municipalities, they made a final list of suggestions for national parks that should get further consideration. The proposed new protections are: Sunnmørsalpane, Hornelen, Masfjordfjella and Øystesefjella. Additionally, they proposed some protected areas to be changed to national park: Lyngsalpan, Sylan, Trollheimen and Innerdalen, Ålfotbreen, Oksøy-Ryvingen, and Flekkefjord and Listastrendene. Many other proposals were cancelled due to local opposition: Kvænangsvidda-Nabar, Treriksrøysa, Preikestolen, Kvitladalen-Bjordalen, Viglesdalen; as well as some proposed changes of type of protection: Naustdal-Gjengedal and Setesdal Vesthei Ryfylkeheiane.

References

External links 

 Norwegian national parks
 Brouchures about National parks in Norway
 Pictures of all mainland national parks

Norway
National Parks
 List
National parks